Fuman (died 1542) was Chieftain of the Jianzhou Jurchens and an ancestor of the future Qing dynasty emperors. His father was Sibeoci Fiyanggū. His family name was Aisin Gioro (愛新覺羅).

History 
Fuman was the great-grandfather of Nurhaci, who would reorganise and unite various Jurchen tribes. He lived in Hetuela or Hetu Ala (赫圖阿拉). From 1522 to 1542, he was governor, known as Dudu Fuman, of the Dudu Jianzhou Left Guard (建州左衛), a post also held and established by his paternal grandfather and father Sibeoci Fiyanggū.

After Fuman died in 1542, he was buried in Hetuela's old city, also known as Xingjing (興京). In 1636, Huang Taiji established the Qing dynasty and posthumously honored Fuman as King of Qing (慶王); in 1648, he was given the posthumous name Emperor Zhi (直皇帝) and temple name Xingzu (興祖). The three ancestors, Qing Zhaozu, Jingzu and Xianzu, were buried in Xingjing. In 1659, Fuman was buried and paid respect at the Yong Mausoleum (清永陵).

Children 
 Desikū (德世庫)
 Liocan (瑠闡), also called Liu Chan (劉闡)
 Soocangga (索長阿)
 Giocangga (覺昌安), ancestor of Nurhaci
 Boolangga (包朗阿)
 Boosi (寶實)

Jurchens in Ming dynasty
Year of birth unknown
1542 deaths